Lincoln Township is a township in Plymouth County, Iowa in the United States. The township is named after President Abraham Lincoln.

The elevation of Lincoln Township is listed as 1283 feet above mean sea level.

References

Townships in Iowa